Castelguglielmo is a comune (municipality) in the Province of Rovigo in the Italian region Veneto, located about  southwest of Venice and about  southwest of Rovigo.

The municipality of Castelguglielmo contains the frazioni (subdivisions, mainly villages and hamlets) Bressane, Canda, Franceschetta, Le Basse, Precona, and Presciane.

Castelguglielmo borders the following municipalities: Bagnolo di Po, Canda, Fiesso Umbertiano, Lendinara, Pincara, San Bellino, Stienta.

Demographic evolution

References

Cities and towns in Veneto